Gerard Mussies (born 1934 in the Hague) is a retired senior lecturer in the New Testament Hellenistic background at the Faculty of Theology at the University of Utrecht, The Netherlands. He taught biblical Greek and studied the Greek-Roman background of the New Testament.

Education 
Mussies became a doctor with the presentation of his thesis in 1971 titled The Morphology of Koine Greek As Used in the Apocalypse of St. John: A Study in Bilingualism.

Books

References 

1934 births
Writers from The Hague
New Testament scholars
Academic staff of Utrecht University
Living people